Calochilus therophilus, commonly known as the mountain beard orchid, is a species of orchid endemic to New South Wales and the Australian Capital Territory. It has a single fleshy, channelled, dark green leaf and up to fifteen green flowers with reddish lines. The labellum has two shiny metallic blue to purple plates near its base and there is no ridge between the two "eyes" on the column.

Description
The leaf is fully developed when the first flower opens. The lateral sepals are a similar length but narrower. The column has two purple "eyes" but lacks a ridge between them. Flowering occurs from October to December.

Taxonomy and naming
Calochilus montanus was first formally described in 2006 by David Jones and the description was published in Australian Orchid Research from a specimen collected on Black Mountain in the Australian Capital Territory. The specific epithet (montanus) is a Latin word meaning "of mountains", referring to the habitat of this species.

Distribution and habitat
The mountain beard orchid grows in open forest on mountain slopes. It occurs in the Australian Capital Territory and in New South Wales south from the Moonbi Range.

References

montanus
Endemic orchids of Australia
Orchids of New South Wales
Orchids of the Australian Capital Territory
Plants described in 2006